Francis Charles Winslow "Patsy" Callighen (February 13, 1906 – October 16, 1964) was a Canadian professional ice hockey player who played 36 regular season and nine playoff games in the National Hockey League. Born in Toronto, Ontario, he played with the New York Rangers.

His name was engraved on the Stanley Cup in 1928 with the New York Rangers. His family, including his only daughter Patsy Nunnally, currently reside in Euclid, Ohio.

References

External links

1906 births
1964 deaths
Canadian ice hockey defencemen
New York Rangers players
People from Old Toronto
Ice hockey people from Toronto
Stanley Cup champions
Canadian expatriate ice hockey players in the United States